Michael Flanagan (born 9 November 1952) is an English former professional footballer and manager.

Playing career
Flanagan made his debut for Charlton Athletic in the 1971-72 season and formed a successful partnership with Derek Hales, although the pair were once sent off in an FA Cup tie for fighting with each other.

During the summer of 1978 Flanagan crossed the Atlantic and signed for the New England Tea Men of the NASL, and subsequently scored 30 goals in 28 league appearances. He also won the MVP award (Most Valuable Player) for the 1978 season, ahead of such players as the legendary Franz Beckenbauer.

In summer 1979 he joined Crystal Palace for £650,000 where he played 56 games scoring 8 goals. December 1980 saw him join Queens Park Rangers. He was capped three times by England 'B', scoring once. Whilst at QPR he played in the 1982 FA Cup Final.

Managerial career
Flanagan managed Gillingham from 1993 until 1995. He also had a spell as manager of Waterford United. He later became assistant manager of Margate, a post he left in July 2007. He was caretaker manager at Maldon & Tiptree from November 2011 until May 2012, and managed Brentwood Town between 2015 and 2016, a club where his son Adam has previously been manager.

References

1952 births
Living people
Footballers from Ilford
Association football forwards
English footballers
English people of Irish descent
Charlton Athletic F.C. players
New England Tea Men players
Crystal Palace F.C. players
Queens Park Rangers F.C. players
Cambridge United F.C. players
England B international footballers
North American Soccer League (1968–1984) players
English football managers
League of Ireland managers
Gillingham F.C. managers
Waterford F.C. managers
Maldon & Tiptree F.C. managers
Brentwood Town F.C. managers
English expatriate sportspeople in the United States
Expatriate soccer players in the United States
English expatriate footballers
FA Cup Final players